The 2nd Baltic Front was a major formation of the Red Army during the Second World War.

History 
The 2nd Baltic Front was formed on October 20, 1943 as a result of the renaming of the Baltic Front, itself a successor of the Bryansk Front 10 days earlier. 

From 1 to 21 November 1943, the left wing of the Front took part in the Polotsk–Vitebsk Offensive. 
In January-February, the front participated in the Leningrad–Novgorod Offensive of 1944. During the Staraya Russa-Novorzhev Offensive, the Front troops reached Ostrov, Pushkinskiye Gory and Idritsa. In July 1944, the Rezhitsa–Dvinsk Offensive was carried out and the Front advanced 200 km to the west. In August it conducted the Madona Offensive, during which it advanced another 60-70 km along the northern shore of the Daugava River and freed the city of Madona, a major junction of railways and highway roads.

In September-October 1944, during the Baltic Offensive, the front troops took part in the Riga Operation and by October 22 reached the Baltic Sea near the Memel river, blocking together with the troops of the 1st Baltic Front, the German Army Group North in the Courland Pocket. Subsequently, until April 1945, they continued the blockade and fought to destroy Army Group Courland. 

On April 1, 1945, the front was abolished and its troops were transferred to the Leningrad Front.

Composition  
On 1 October 1944 the 2nd Baltic Front consisted of:

3rd Shock Army
79th Rifle Corps
150th Rifle Division
171st Rifle Division
207th Rifle Division
 100th Rifle Corps
21st Guards Rifle Division
28th Rifle Division
200th Rifle Division
10th Guards Army
7th Guards Rifle Corps 
7th Rifle Division
8th Rifle Division
119th Guards Rifle Division
15th Guards Rifle Corps (29th, 30, 85th Guards Rifle Divisions)
19th Guards Rifle Corps (22, 56, 65GRD)
78th Tank Brigade
22nd Army
93rd Rifle Corps (219, 379, 391 Rifle Divisions)
130th Rifle Corps (43rd Guards Rifle Division, 308th Rifle Division)
37th Rifle Division, 155FR, 118TB
42nd Army
110th Rifle Corps (2, 168, 268RD)
124th Rifle Corps (48th, 123rd, 256th Rifle Divisions)
118FR, 29GTB
15th Air Army
14th Fighter Aviation Corps (4, 148, 293 Fighter Aviation Regiments), 
188th Bomber Aviation Division, 
214th Assault Aviation Division
225 Assault AvD
284th Fighter-Bomber Aviation Division
313th Fighter-Bomber Aviation Division
Front Reserve
5th Tank Corps (24, 41, 70TB, 5MotRB)

Commanders
Colonel-General Markian Popov (10.43 to 04.1944),
Army General Andrey Yeryomenko (04.1944 to 02.1945),
Marshal Leonid Govorov (02.1945 to 03.1945).

Baltic 2
Military units and formations established in 1943